Major General Mohammad Dawran (born January 20, 1954) was Commander of the Afghan Air Force. He was promoted to the post in 2005 by Defense Minister Abdul Rahim Wardak and the Commander-in-Chief Bismillah Khan Mohammadi. His permanent post was in Bagram Air Base, the largest air base in Afghanistan and one of the largest air bases in the region. The new commander of the Afghan Air Force, Amanuddin Mansoor, was appointed in December 2021.

He was born in the Nijrab District of Kapisa Province of Afghanistan. He is an ethnic Tajik. Dawran became an air force pilot in the 1980s and was one of two people selected for the 1988 Soyuz TM-6, the sixth crewed spacecraft to visit the Soviet Space Station Mir. Instead of Dawran, Abdul Ahad Momand was chosen, which became his second space journey. Dawran is married and has six children.

References

Bibliography
 

Living people
Afghan military personnel
Air force generals
1954 births
Afghan military officers